The New England Translators Association (NETA) is a professional organization of translators and interpreters with approximately 200 members.

Membership is open to anyone who is a practicing translator, interpreter, translation editor, or teacher. However, NETA does not have agency memberships; members must derive at least 20% of their "translation-related" income from their own translation, interpreting, editing, or teaching work.

NETA is an independent, non-profit organization unaffiliated with the American Translators Association.

External links
New England Translators Association, Inc.

Translation associations of the United States
Organizations based in Massachusetts